Müneccimbaşı (sometimes also spelled as Müneccimbashi, Müneccimbasi, Munejjimbashi, or Munejjim-bashi) was the title given to the chief court astrologer in the Ottoman Empire. The title was held in succession from the 15th century until the demise of the Empire.

Since the late-17th century "müneccimbaşı" Ahmet Dede was also famous as a historian and man of letters and since he is cited along with his title in and regarding his works, the term may be used in some sources in reference solely to Müneccimbaşı Ahmed Dede.

See also
 Istanbul observatory of Taqi al-Din
 Muwaqqit
 Officeholders
 Müneccimbaşı Ahmed Dede
 Mustafa ibn Ali al-Muwaqqit
 Taqi ad-Din Muhammad ibn Ma'ruf

Civil servants from the Ottoman Empire
Ottoman culture
Astrologers from the Ottoman Empire